The emperor or empress of all the Russias or all Russia (often titled tsar or tsarina/tsaritsa) was the monarch of the Russian Empire. 

The title originated in connection with Russia's victory in the Great Northern War of 17001721 and appeared as the adaptation of the tsar's title under the accepted system of titling in Europe. The suffix "of all the Russias" was transformed from the previous version "(Tsar) of All Rus'".

Title

Article 1 of the Fundamental Laws of the Russian Empire stated that "the Emperor of All Russia is an autocratic and unrestricted monarch. To obey his supreme authority, not only out of fear but out of conscience as well, God himself commands".

The full title of the emperor in the 20th century (Art.37 of the Fundamental Laws) was:

Tsarist autocracy

List of emperors

Nicholas II abdicated in favour of his brother, Grand Duke Michael Alexandrovich, but the next day, after a nominal reign of only 18 hours, "Emperor Michael II" declined power, ending dynastic rule in Russia. 

See List of leaders of Russia for the continuation of leadership.

History

The title of the Emperor of All Russia was introduced for Peter the Great. After the victory at the Great Northern War and signing the Treaty of Nystad, in September 1721 Senate and Synod decided to award Peter with the title of the Emperor of All Russia with the following statement: "in the manner of the Roman Senate for the noble cause of emperors such titles publicly given them as a gift and into statues for the everlasting generations inscribed".

On November 2, 1721 Peter I accepted the title. The Dutch Republic and Kingdom of Prussia immediately recognized the new title of the Russian Tsar, followed by the Kingdom of Sweden in 1723, the Ottoman Empire in 1739, the United Kingdom and Austria in 1742, the Holy Roman Empire, the Kingdom of France and the Spain in 1745, and finally the Polish–Lithuanian Commonwealth in 1764. Since then the Russian State was referred to as the Russian Empire.

On February 16, 1722 Peter I issued the Decree of Succession by which he abolished the old custom of passing the throne to the direct descendants in the male line, but allowed the appointment of an heir through any decent person, at the will of the monarch.

Coronation ceremony

Coronations in the Russian Empire involved a highly developed religious ceremony in which the Emperor was crowned and invested with regalia, then anointed with chrism and formally blessed by the church to commence his reign.  Although rulers of Muscovy had been crowned prior to the reign of Ivan III, their coronation rituals assumed overt Byzantine overtones as the result of the influence of Ivan's wife Sophia Paleologue, and the imperial ambitions of his grandson, Ivan IV.  The modern coronation, introducing "European-style" elements, replaced the previous "crowning" ceremony and was first used for Catherine I in 1724. Since czarist Russia claimed to be the "Third Rome" and the replacement of Byzantium as the true Christian state, the Russian rite was designed to link its rulers and prerogatives to those of the so-called "Second Rome" (Constantinople).

While months or even years could pass between the initial accession of the sovereign and the performance of this ritual, church policy held that the monarch must be anointed and crowned according to the Orthodox rite to have a successful tenure.  As the church and state were essentially one in Imperial Russia, this service invested the Tsars with political legitimacy; however, this was not its only intent.  It was equally perceived as conferring a genuine spiritual benefit that mystically wedded sovereign to subjects, bestowing divine authority upon the new ruler.  As such, it was similar in purpose to other European coronation ceremonies from the medieval era.

Even when the imperial capital was located at St. Petersburg (1713–1728, 1732–1917), Russian coronations were always held in Moscow at the Cathedral of the Dormition in the Kremlin.  The last coronation service in Russia was held on 26 May 1896 for Nicholas II and his wife Alexandra Feodorovna, who would be the final Tsar and Tsaritsa of Russia.  The Russian Imperial regalia survived the subsequent Russian Revolution and the Communist period, and are currently on exhibit in a museum at the Kremlin Armoury.

See also 
 Church reform of Peter the Great
 Digest of Laws of the Russian Empire
 Government reform of Peter the Great
 Government reform of Alexander I
 His Imperial Majesty's Own Chancellery
 Imperial Crown of Russia
 Judicial system of the Russian Empire
 Most Holy Synod
 Patriarch of Moscow and all Rus'
 Pauline Laws
 Rulers of Russia family tree
 Russian Constitution of 1906
 State Council (Russian Empire)
 Table of Ranks

Notes

References

External links
 Excerpts from Statesman's Handbook for Russia. By the Chancery of the Committee of Ministers, St. Petersburg. 1896.

 
 
Russia